Dendrochronologia is a peer-reviewed, international scholarly journal that presents high-quality research related to growth rings of woody plants, i.e., trees and shrubs, and the application of tree-ring studies.

The areas covered by the journal include, but are not limited to:
Archaeology
Botany
Climatology
Ecology
Forestry
Geology
Hydrology

The current Editor-in-Chief is Paolo Cherubini. The Editorial Coordinator is Erin Gleeson.

References

External links
Dendrochronologia online

Archaeology journals
Botany journals
Climatology journals
Ecology journals
Forestry journals
Quaternary science journals